The 1921 Tonawanda Kardex season was their sole season in the National Football League, in which they played only one game. The team finished 0–1 in league play, and tied for eighteenth place in the league.

Schedule

 Games in italics were against non-NFL teams.

Standings

Notes

References

Tonawanda Kardex seasons
Tonawanda Kardex
National Football League winless seasons